Christine Smith Wilson (born May 15, 1970) is an American attorney who serves on the Federal Trade Commission (FTC). Wilson was appointed to this position in 2018 by President Donald Trump and was confirmed by the Senate in April 2018. She replaced Maureen Ohlhausen. 

Since the resignation of Noah J. Phillips in October 2022, Wilson has been the sole Republican on the FTC.

Early life and education 
Christine Alyssa Bishop Smith was born May 15, 1970 in Orlando, Florida. Wilson received her undergraduate degree from the University of Florida and studied law at the Georgetown University Law Center, where she graduated cum laude.   

While at Georgetown, she served as a law clerk at the FTC Bureau of Competition, and later joined the agency as chief of staff to FTC Chair Tim Muris. During this period, she became an associate of future U.S. Senator Ted Cruz, who at the time was serving as head of the Office of Policy Planning within the FTC. Wilson later became a donor to Cruz's 2012 Senate and 2016 presidential campaigns.

Legal career 
In private practice, Wilson served as Senior Vice President for Legal, Regulatory & International for Delta Air Lines. Prior to working for Delta, Wilson worked at both Kirkland & Ellis LLP and O’Melveny & Myers LLP, where she specialized in competition law. 

Wilson has long advocated for the presence of more women in the antitrust field, and co-founded The Grapevine, a D.C.-based networking platform to encourage women to work in competition law roles.

Political activity 
Wilson has long been involved in Republican Party politics. Wilson donated $2,700 to Ted Cruz's presidential campaign in 2016 and $2,500 to Cruz’s Senate campaign in 2011. During the 2008 presidential campaign, Wilson served on the antitrust committee that advised John McCain’s presidential campaign.

Federal Trade Comission 
In 2018, President Donald Trump selected Wilson to serve as a member of the FTC, and she assumed office later that year. 

In a February 2023 piece in the Wall Street Journal, Wilson announced her resignation from the FTC, citing her opposition to chair Lina Khan's leadership of the agency and Khan's refusal to recuse from a FTC lawsuit to block Meta's acquisition of a virtual reality app maker. While working as a staffer on the House Judiciary Committee, Khan helped author a report whose "findings and recommendations clearly show[ed] that it is long-past time for Congress to enact meaningful updates to our antitrust laws to address the lack of competition in digital markets and the monopoly power," of tech firms. After her resignation, commentators reported that while at the FTC, Wilson voted to approve a $74-billion pharmaceutical merger between Bristol-Myers and Celgene. Wilson had represented Bristol-Myers while an antitrust partner at Kirkland & Ellis.

References 

Federal Trade Commission
Antitrust lawyers
Georgetown University Law Center alumni
University of Florida alumni
Federal Trade Commission personnel
1970 births
Living people
People associated with Kirkland & Ellis
People associated with O'Melveny & Myers